On December 23, 1995, the San Diego Chargers and the New York Giants faced off in Week 17 of the 1995 NFL season. The game was played at Giants Stadium in East Rutherford, New Jersey, United States and was the last regular season game for both teams. The Chargers defeated the Giants, 27-17.

The game, which was nationally televised by NBC, became infamous due to the conduct of the fans in the stands that afternoon. A major snowstorm had swept through the New York metropolitan area during the week leading into the game, leaving maintenance crews unable to clear the seating areas in time for the game; as a result, many fans took to throwing snowballs in the stands and onto the field. The chaos that ensued nearly resulted in the Giants being forced to forfeit the game.

Background

Chargers

Entering the final week of the 1995 season, the defending AFC champion Chargers were 8-7 and in danger of missing out on a playoff spot. The team had started the season with three wins in their first four contests, but had followed that up with six losses in their next seven to put them at 4–7. The Chargers had won their last four and needed only to record a win in their final Week 17 matchup with the Giants to secure one of the AFC's three Wild Card spots.

Giants

The Giants’ fortunes, meanwhile, were quite the opposite. Looking to return to the playoffs for the second time under Dan Reeves and coming off their second consecutive winning season, the Giants opened the 1995 season with a blowout loss to the Dallas Cowboys on national television. New York lost four of its first five games, and a four-game losing streak in November ensured a losing record for the season. The Giants entered the matchup with the Chargers at 5-10, having again lost to the Cowboys a week earlier; the last time the team had lost at least ten games was under Ray Handley, Reeves’ predecessor, in 1992.

Broadcast information
At the time that this game was played, the NFL had been scheduling a Saturday afternoon doubleheader of games during the last few weeks of the season. Both games would be broadcast nationwide, with one game carried by the network with the broadcast rights to the NFC, which in 1995 was Fox, and the other carried by the network with the broadcasting rights to the AFC, which in 1995 was NBC. The NFL would later add a third game to their Saturday schedule, which was aired in prime time on either ABC or ESPN, and would keep this schedule until the end of the 2005 season, after which the NFL decided to schedule Saturday games much more sporadically. 

Since this was an interconference matchup, the broadcast rules of the day dictated that the broadcasting rights for the game would belong to the network holding the visiting team’s conference broadcast rights. Since the Chargers were members of the AFC, that meant that NBC would carry the game. Marv Albert provided the play-by-play, with Cris Collinsworth as the analyst and Will McDonough reporting from the sidelines.

The Chargers' radio broadcast was carried by flagship XETRA-AM with Lee Hamilton as play-by-play. The Giants' broadcast was produced by WFAN but carried over its then flagship WOR (AM), with Bob Papa and Dick Lynch in the booth. The game was also carried nationally by CBS Radio Sports.

In an odd scheduling coincidence, this was the second time the Chargers had played on a Saturday in three weeks; two weeks earlier, they had played the Arizona Cardinals in another interconference affair (the Cardinals, at the time, were in the same division as the Giants and would continue to be until the end of the 2001 season). That game also became notable for the ill-received experiment by Fox Sports to use a two-man, analyst-only broadcast team.

Game summary

The Giants opened the scoring after forcing the Chargers to punt on their opening possession. After converting consecutive third downs and crossing into San Diego territory, Dave Brown found Charles Way for a long pass play that put the Giants inside the Chargers' 10-yard line. New York settled for a field goal after Brown fumbled, Rodney Hampton gained three yards, and an incomplete pass. Brad Daluiso's 30-yard field goal put the Giants ahead 3–0.

On the ensuing drive, Chargers starter Stan Humphries suffered a neck injury and was unable to continue. Backup quarterback Gale Gilbert came in but the Giants forced another punt. The Chargers responded by stopping Tyrone Wheatley after two short runs and Brown missed Chris Calloway on third down. Chargers punt returner Andre Coleman fumbled the kick on fourth down, however, and the Giants recovered. With the ball on the San Diego 23-yard line, it took the Giants four plays to score as Brown ran in from three yards out. The extra point made the score 10–0.

The Giants then forced the Chargers into a three-and-out on their next drive, but they would suffer their own punt miscue as Arthur Marshall fumbled and the Chargers recovered on the 16-yard line. After Aaron Hayden got two short gains, Gilbert threw an incompletion on third down. John Carney put the Chargers on the board with a field goal, making the score 10–3.

New York scored their second touchdown on a long drive just before the half. Brown completed all six passes he threw on the drive, including a third down completion to Marshall that brought the Giants to the San Diego 1-yard line. Hampton would cap off the drive with a touchdown run and Daluiso added the extra point to make the score 17–3. These would be the last points the Giants would score.

On the opening drive of the second half, the Giants turned the ball over when Mike Sherrard fumbled after catching a short pass from Brown on third down. The Chargers took advantage of the short field and on the seventh play of their drive, Hayden scored on an eight-yard touchdown run. Carney's extra point cut the deficit to seven.

The Giants tried to make up for their gaffe on the previous drive and moved the ball again into the opposing side of the field, as Brown's completion to Aaron Pierce gained twenty-four yards and put New York at the San Diego 29. Three straight incompletions followed, however, and Daluiso missed his field goal attempt.

After both teams traded punts, San Diego tied the game in the fourth quarter. The Giants had a chance to stop the Chargers on fourth down at their 29-yard line, but Gilbert found Tony Martin for a 13-yard completion to keep the drive going. The Chargers again found themselves down to a fourth down three plays later, but Rodney Culver found the end zone on an eight-yard touchdown run. Carney made the extra point to even the score at 17.

The Giants took advantage of a short kick by Carney and Brian Kozlowski's return set them up at their own 47. Brown completed a pass to Sherrard for fourteen yards and Hampton followed with three more significant gains to put the Giants at the 9-yard line with a chance to regain the lead. However, Hampton was stopped for a loss on first-and-goal, and on the next play Brown threw a pass that was intercepted by Shaun Gayle at the 1 and taken the entire length of the field for a Chargers touchdown and a 24–17 lead with the extra point.

Brown then lost a fumble on the next drive, giving the Chargers the ball inside New York territory on the 40-yard line. San Diego forced the Giants to use two of their timeouts by rushing the ball with Hayden four times, and then Carney came out and closed the scoring with a field goal. A failed fourth down conversion was the result of the Giants' subsequent drive and Brown was sacked on the final play.

Officials
Referee: Ron Blum (#7)
Umpire: Bob Wagner (#100)
Head Linesman: Dale Williams (#8)
Line Judge: Bill Spyksma (#12)
Back Judge: Al Jury (#106)
Side Judge: Don Carlsen (#39)
Field Judge: Kirk Dornan (#6)

The conditions
The New York metropolitan area had been experiencing a more active than normal storm season as winter approached in December 1995. In the nine days leading up to this particular game, three significant storms had blown through the area. The last of these three was the most severe of the storms, as the area surrounding the Meadowlands received upwards of nine to twelve inches of new snow on top of what had already been sitting on the ground from the previous two.

Stadium maintenance workers managed to clear out the aisles before the game started so fans were able to get to their seats. Much of the seating areas were still covered in snow, however, and had been sitting exposed to the elements for three days prior to the game. Entering the weekend, wind chills in the area were below freezing and any snow that had been left behind had frozen over. Attendance that day was significantly below full capacity, due in part to the weather and icy conditions and also because of the Giants’ poor play to that point. Just over 50,000 fans showed up for the game.

To pass the time, some fans began making snowballs and tossing them at each other. More and more fans began joining in the snowball fights and stadium security began to lose control of the situation. Eventually, the snowballs began making their way out of the stands and onto the field of play, which made an already dangerous situation significantly worse as the safety of the players and coaches of both teams was in jeopardy due to the frozen projectiles coming from the crowd. In all, ten of the stadium's security guards were injured, fourteen fans were arrested, and 175 were removed from the stadium. Things got so out of control that Chargers players did not bother to take their helmets off once they reached the sideline for concern that they might be struck in their heads. Will McDonough, who as noted above was reporting on the sidelines, had to hide under a kicking net so he could avoid being hit with the icy projectiles.

Referee Ron Blum had finally decided that he had seen enough and early in the fourth quarter, he called a halt to the action and went to the San Diego sideline to use the team’s telephone system to call up to the public address booth. While he was doing this, a fan threw a snowball that struck Chargers equipment manager Sid Brooks in the back of the head, causing him to fall face first onto the stadium’s artificial turf. Blum had to have two Chargers assistants stand near him holding clipboards over his head so that he would not be struck as well. 

After Blum finished speaking with stadium public address announcer Bob Sheppard, the latter made an announcement that if the fans continued to throw snowballs onto the field, the game would be called off and the Chargers would be declared the winners by forfeit. The snowballs kept flying, especially as Gayle returned his interception for the winning touchdown, but the game was played to its conclusion. Reeves, in his postgame interview, said that he would have been fine with the forfeit saying that the fans who were throwing snowballs had no respect for other people. Giants owner Wellington Mara agreed. The team would later purchase a full-page advertisement in the local San Diego newspapers apologizing for the incident, and the league decided not to pursue discipline against them.

During the game, an Associated Press photographer snapped a photo of a man in a brown coat throwing a snowball. The Giants and the New Jersey Sports and Exposition Authority asked for assistance in identifying him, offering a reward, and after fifteen people notified the team that they knew the man, New Jersey State Police arrested Jeffrey Lange, a 26-year-old man from Readington, New Jersey on December 27. Facing a judge on January 3, 1996, Lange pleaded innocent to charges of improper behavior and claimed he was being scapegoated for the entire incident and the unwelcome publicity had cost him his job. Lange was eventually convicted in April 1996 in East Rutherford municipal court and received a fine, which he appealed. The Bergen County Superior Court affirmed the verdict in August 1996.

Aftermath
The Giants-Chargers game was one of two to take place at Giants Stadium that weekend, with the New York Jets playing host to the New Orleans Saints in their season finale the following day. There were no further snow throwing incidents that weekend as the remaining snow was cleared from the stands before kickoff. (The Jets, like the Giants, failed to record the victory at home as the Saints defeated them 12-0 for their thirteenth loss of the season.)

The Chargers' win resulted in the team advancing to the playoffs as the highest seeded Wild Card team, and they earned a home game in the playoffs. They were defeated by the Indianapolis Colts, however, and did not return to the postseason 
afterward until 2004.

The Giants’ 5-11 finish was their worst since Bill Parcells’ rookie year as coach in 1983, when they went 3-12-1. The team decided, in spite of their regression from the prior season when they went 9-7 and barely missed the playoffs, to retain the services of Dan Reeves as head coach for 1996 (he would be fired following that season after recording a 6–10 record).

Rodney Culver's touchdown was his third rushing touchdown of the season and the last of his NFL career. On May 11, 1996, Culver was aboard ValuJet Flight 592 when it crashed into the Florida Everglades following a fire in the cabin, killing everyone on the aircraft.

References

1995 National Football League season
National Football League games
New York Giants
San Diego Chargers
American football incidents
December 1995 sports events in the United States
1995 in sports in New Jersey
Sports competitions in East Rutherford, New Jersey